Grasim Industries Ground is a multi-purpose stadium in Nagda, India. The ground is mainly used for organizing matches of football, cricket and other sports.  The stadium hosted one first-class match  in 1988 when Madhya Pradesh cricket team played against Vidarbha cricket team. Since then the stadium has not hosted any cricket matches.

References

External links 

 cricketarchive
 cricinfo

Malwa
Ujjain
Sports venues in Madhya Pradesh
Sports venues in Ujjain
Sport in Madhya Pradesh
Buildings and structures in Ujjain
Cricket grounds in Madhya Pradesh
Sports venues completed in 1988
Football venues in Madhya Pradesh
1988 establishments in Madhya Pradesh
20th-century architecture in India